Dah (trans. Breath) was a Yugoslav and later Belgian progressive rock band formed in Belgrade in 1972.

Dah was formed by guitarist Zlatko Manojlović and guitarist and vocalist Branko Marušić "Čutura", the two previously performing together in the band Džentlmeni. After the release of Dah's debut single in 1973, Marušić left the band, so Manojlović took the singing duties. After the release of their debut album, Veliki cirkus (1974), which brought the nationwide hit "Šošana", the band moved to Belgium, changing their name to Land. After spending a year in Belgium and having an international hit with the English language version of "Šošana", the band returned to Yugoslavia, where they released their second album, Povratak (1976). When Zlatko Manojlović went to serve his mandatory stint in the Yugoslav army, his brother, keyboardist Goran Manojlović, took over leading of Dah, the group disbanding in 1979. Zlatko Manojlović would continue his career as the leader of the band Gordi, and later as a successful solo artist.

History
Dah was formed in 1972 by Zlatko Manojlović (a former Džentlmeni and Fleš member, guitar) and Branko Marušić "Čutura" (a former Albatrosi and Džentlmeni member, guitar and vocals). The first lineup also featured Branko Gluščević (a former Iskre, Siluete and Lutalice member, bass guitar) and Radomir Dubičanin (a former Fleš member, drums). In April 1973, the band performed at BOOM Festival in Ljubljana and their song "Ako poželiš" ("If You Wish") was released on the double live album BOOM Pop Fest '73 recorded on the festival. Soon after, the band released their debut 7-inch single with songs "Ako poželiš" and "Noćna buka" ("Night Noise"), which they promoted performing in the display window of a record shop.

After the release of the single, Marušić left the band and began his solo career. Manojlović took the singing duties, and Dah performed as a power trio for a year and a half. After Dubičanin moved to Siluete, he was replaced by Velibor "Boka" Bogdanović (a former Plavi Dečaci, Džentlmeni, YU Grupa and Opus member). For a while the band performed with violinist Dragan Mihajlović, and on several occasions the band worked in studio with organist Miodrag Okrugić (a former Beduini, YU Grupa and Opus member), this cooperation being recorded on the single "Gitareska" ("Gitaresque").

Dah debut album Veliki cirkus (The Big Circus) was released in 1974 through Jugoton. The album lyrics were written by the disc jockey Zoran Modli. The lyrics for some of the songs, such as "Prohujalo sa vihorom" ("Gone with the Wind"), "Majka Jugovića" ("Mother of the Jugovićs") and "Troil i Kesida" ("Troilus and Criseyde") were inspired by great works of literature. The album brought the hit "Šošana", the melody of which was based on Yosef Hadar's composition "Erev Shel Shoshanim".

In 1975, the band moved to Belgium, where they performed under the name Land. The Belgian lineup of the band featured, alongside Manojlović and Bogdanović, Zlatko Manojlović's brother Goran (keyboards), Tommy Splitwood (bass guitar) and Willy Pultz (guitar). This lineup released the English language version of "Šošana" (entitled "Shoshana") as a single. The single was very successful, Polydor Records releasing it in West Germany, France, Belgium, Netherlands, Luxembourg, Austria and Spain, and reaching No. 1 on the Morocco national radio chart. After the single release, the band performed as an opening band for Focus. Eventually, the lineup split-up, Splitwood and Pultz continuing their career in the band Cool Breeze.

In 1976, Yugoslav members moved back to Yugoslavia, changed their name back to Dah and released their second album, Povratak (The Return), which featured a new version of "Šošana". In 1977, the band leader Zlatko Manojlović went to serve his mandatory stint in the Yugoslav People's Army, and his brother Goran became the temporary leader of Dah. The last Dah lineup featured, beside Goran Manojlović, Zdenko Pomper (bass guitar), Vidoja Božinović (a former Dim Bez Vatre and Pop Mašina member, guitar), Dušan Đukić "Đuka" (a former Immamorata and Pop Mašina member, drums) and the singer Latke. This lineup of the band performed for a year and disbanded. Upon his return from the army, Zlatko Manojlović formed the band Gordi, and later started a successful solo career.

Legacy
In 1991, Serbian and Yugoslav alternative rock band Disciplina Kičme sampled Dah song "Noćna buka" in their song  "Buka u modi" ("Noise in Fashion"). In 1994, Serbian and Yugoslav pop rock band Ruž covered the song "Šošana" on their album N˚4, which was produced by Manojlović.

Discography

Studio albums
Veliki cirkus (1974)
Povratak (1976)

Singles
"Ako poželiš" / "Noćna buka" (1973)
"Samo jedna noć" / "Cvrčak" (1973)
"Gitareska" / "Ti si ta" (1974)
"Mali princ" / "Ime" (1974)
"Šošana" / "Please, Don't Say Nothing" (as Land, 1975)
"Žeđ" / "Misli" (1976)
"Tomorrow" / "Under The Sky" (1977)

Other appearances
"Ako poželiš" (BOOM Pop Fest '73, 1973)

References

External links
 Dah at Discogs
 Dah at Prog Archives

Serbian progressive rock groups
Serbian folk rock groups
Yugoslav rock music groups
Yugoslav progressive rock groups
Belgian progressive rock groups
Musical groups from Belgrade
Musical groups established in 1972
Musical groups disestablished in 1978